Dilunga is a city of the Democratic Republic of the Congo.  It is located in Kasai-Oriental Province. As of 2012, it had an estimated population of 25,079.

References 

Populated places in Kasaï-Oriental